Frontinellina is a genus of  dwarf spiders that was first described by P. J. van Helsdingen in 1969.  it contains only three species, found in Kazakhstan, Portugal, Russia, South Africa, and Turkey: F. dearmata, F. frutetorum, and F. locketi.

See also
 List of Linyphiidae species (A–H)

References

Araneomorphae genera
Linyphiidae
Palearctic spiders
Spiders of South Africa